Toneşti may refer to several villages in Romania:

 Toneşti, a village in Leleasca Commune, Olt County
 Toneşti, a village in Sâmburești Commune, Olt County